Boothiomyces is a genus of fungi belonging to the family Terramycetaceae.

The genus has almost cosmopolitan distribution.

Species:
 Boothiomyces macroporosus (Karling) Letcher

References

Chytridiomycota
Chytridiomycota genera